Hebrew spelling refers to the way words are spelled in the Hebrew language. The Hebrew alphabet contains 22 letters, all of which are primarily consonants.  This is because the Hebrew script is an abjad, that is, its letters indicate consonants, not vowels or syllables. An early system to overcome this, still used today, is matres lectionis, where four of these letters, alef, he, waw and yodh also serve as vowel letters. Later, a system of vowel points to indicate vowels (Hebrew diacritics), called niqqud, was developed.

History

Throughout history, there have been two main systems of Hebrew spelling. One is vocalized spelling, the other is unvocalized spelling.

In vocalized spelling (ktiv menuqad), all of the vowels are indicated by vowel points (called niqqud). In unvocalized spelling (ktiv hasar niqqud), the vowel points are omitted, but can be substituted by other vowels - waw and yodh (Ktiv malē). This system is the spelling system commonly used in Modern Hebrew today.

Vowel points are always optional in Hebrew. They can be used fully, partially or not used at all. The recommended approach endorsed today by the Academy of the Hebrew Language and other Israeli educational institutions is to use plēnē spelling (matres lectionis) when not adding vowel dots (which is the usual case), and place a vocalization sign on a letter only when ambiguity cannot be resolved otherwise. The "defective" spelling is recommended for a fully vocalized text, hence its use is becoming rare. Texts older than 50–60 years may be written in an unvocalized defective spelling (for example, the word ħamiším "fifty", was written חמשים on banknotes issued in Mandatory Palestine or the Bank of Israel in its early days. Today, the common spelling is חמישים). A vocalized plene spelling system is common in children's books, when it is better to accustom the children to the more popular plene spelling, while still letting them benefit from the vowel dots as a reading aid in early learning stages.

A third system that was endorsed in the past by the Academy of the Hebrew Language as an optimal system, but abandoned due to low popularity, calls for the use of ħolám (וֹ), šurúq (וּ), dagéš in Bet, Kaf and Pe (בּ, כּ, פּ vs. ב, כ, פ), Šin Smalít (שׂ) and mappíq (הּ), while abandoning all other vowel dots (in everyday writing). According to this system, matres lectionis are still introduced to mark vowels, but the letter Vav is used only as a consonant, while its variants ħolám and šurúq serve as vowel letters. This system also makes clear distinction between final He used as a vowel marker (e.g. ילדה  "a girl" ) and as a consonant (e.g. ילדהּ  "her child"). This system was never extensively used, and the Academy of the Hebrew Language finally abandoned it in 1992, when new rules were published not assuming any use of vowel dots.

Unvocalized spelling rules were instituted by the Hebrew Language Committee in 1890 (which became the Academy of the Hebrew Language in 1953) and formally standardised in 1996. Even though the rules are established, some of the rules and specific spellings are disputed by writers and publishers, who often create their own in-house spelling system. Also, because having two spelling systems within the same language is confusing, some would like to reform it. In 2004, Mordechai Mishor, one of the academy's linguists, proposed in a session of the Academy of the Hebrew Language a modest reform.

Usage today
There are three systems of spelling used for Modern Hebrew.
Ktiv hasar ("missing spelling"): This defective script may be found in the Sefer Torah read in synagogue. It is sometimes considered to be anachronistic in everyday life, although it is still sometimes found in newspapers and published books. This is the original Hebrew spelling. It is called the "missing spelling" because it does not use niqqud.
Ktiv menuqad ("dotted spelling" or "vowelized spelling"): This system of spelling is called "vowelized spelling" and "dotted spelling" because unlike "missing spelling," this system shows exactly how the vowels are in addition to using the dots system ("nekudot"). It is rarely used in everyday life. However, it is used wherever someone wants their writings to be clear and unambiguous, such as children's books, poetry, language instruction for newcomers, or ambiguous or foreign terms. However, it is very cumbersome and inconvenient in everyday life.
Ktiv male or Ktiv hasar niqqud ("full spelling" or "spelling lacking niqqud"): This is the dominant system of spelling in Israel, personal correspondence, movie subtitles, etc.  Ktiv Male is created to be a niqqud-less spelling that uses matres lectionis (consonant that are also used as vowels: aleph, he, waw, yodh) instead of the vowel pointers.

Examples

To illustrate the problem with Ktiv haser:
1 spelled the same as  -  = "he adopted" - in Ktiv menuqad 
2 spelled the same as  -   = "he was drawn" - in Ktiv menuqad 
3 spelled the same as  -   = "land plot" - in Ktiv menuqad  
4 spelled the same as  -   = "years" - in Ktiv menuqad

Usage of multiple systems

In practice, many times two or more spelling systems are used in one text. This clarifies that the vowel is an "o" and not "u". In addition, 3 letters (historically 6), can take a different sound depending on if there is a dot (called a dagesh) in the middle of the letter (a bet, kaf, and pe). In full spelling, the dot is not included, regardless if it is making one sound or the other. An example when a mixture of systems would be used is to clarify when the letter is taking a dagesh. An example of this is shown in the adjacent picture, where for the word kosher ( (with niqqud),  (full spelling)) may be written as כּשר (a mixture of the two systems) to be unambiguous that it is the letter כּ  and not כ . Words may be written in ktiv haser ("missing spelling") if it is unambiguous and clear enough (ex. חנכה  instead of the "full" form חנוכה). In this case, the reader deciphers the word mostly by its context.

Also, some words are almost always written in the "missing" form (ktiv haser) in everyday life: לא (no), אמא (mother), אם (if), and כנרת (Kinneret); however, the Academy of the Hebrew Language favors אימא and כינרת, as well as צוהריים and מוחרתיים.

See also
Hebrew grammar
Plene scriptum
Romanization of Hebrew
Hebraization of English

References

Hebrew language
Hebrew alphabet
Orthographies by language